Francine Epstein (May 19, 1924 - November 9, 2007) was an American screenwriter. She was the creator of the short-lived American police drama television series Amy Prentiss and the wife of producer Cy Chermak.

Career 
Carroll started her career in 1970, writing a few episodes for the crime drama television series Ironside.

In 1974, Carroll left writing on Ironside and created the NBC police drama television series Amy Prentiss, which starred Jessica Walter as "Amy Prentiss".

In 1998, Carroll was a screenwriter for the television film Rescuers: Stories of Courage: Two Families along with her husband Cy Chermak, Paul Monash and Malka Drucker. She was nominated for an Writers Guild of America Award for the 60 Minute Category and a Humanitas Prize nomination for Episodic Drama.

Death 
Carroll died in November 2007 of natural causes at the Encino-Tarzana Regional Medical Center in Tarzana, California, at the age of 83.

References

External links 

1924 births
2007 deaths
People from New York City
American women television writers
20th-century American screenwriters
20th-century American women
21st-century American women